On 28 October 2022, two telecommunications workers were lynched by a mob amid reports of the kidnapping of children in Machhar Colony, Karachi. Later, in a statement, the Kemari district police said that some individuals circulated "false rumors" that two people were attempting to kidnap children in a car near a private school.

Background

Investigation
34 people were allegedly captured by police and rangers during nocturnal operations in Machar Colony and surrounding areas.

References

2022 in Pakistan
October 2022 events in Pakistan